Marvadene (Bubbles) Anderson (born 1 May 1993) is a Jamaican basketball and netball player, at one time recognized as the world's tallest teenage girl at . Anderson is originally from Prospect in Clarendon Parish, where she attended Edwin Allen Comprehensive High School. She also played in the Jamaican U16 netball team. Anderson subsequently travelled to the United States on a basketball scholarship to Rutgers Preparatory School in New Jersey.

As the world's tallest teenage girl, Anderson was featured on The Learning Channel documentary The World's Tallest Children, and in 2010 she was interviewed on The Oprah Winfrey Show. Anderson committed to play basketball at the University of Pittsburgh, and redshirted during the 2012-13 season.

References

Jamaican women's basketball players
Pittsburgh Panthers women's basketball players
Jamaican netball players
Living people
People from Clarendon Parish, Jamaica
Rutgers Preparatory School alumni
Centers (basketball)
1993 births